XHRI-FM is a radio station on 102.9 FM in Reynosa, Tamaulipas, Mexico, known as Radio Rey.

History
XERI-AM 810 received its concession on December 21, 1960. It was a 250-watt daytimer owned by José Francisco Leal Marroquín. Radio Impulsora, S.A., became the concessionaire in 1966. By the 1980s, XERI was broadcasting at night and had doubled its daytime power to 500 watts.

In June 2020, XERI-AM began its AM-FM migration by signing on XHRI-FM 102.9. In October, the station announced its adoption of the Los 40 franchise pop format.

The AM station was turned off in July 2021 after the required year of simulcasting

On February 1, 2023, the programming of Radio Rey returns.

References

External links
 

1960 establishments in Mexico
Radio stations established in 1960
Radio stations in Reynosa
Spanish-language radio stations